Artifodina kurokoi is a moth of the family Gracillariidae. It is known from Thailand.

References

Gracillariinae
Moths described in 1995